Jason Scott Burnell (born August 15, 1997) is an American professional basketball player for New Basket Brindisi of the Lega Basket Serie A. He played college basketball for Jacksonville State.

Early life and high school career
Burnell grew up in DeLand, Florida and originally attended DeLand High School. As a junior, he averaged 22 points and 10 rebounds per game for the Bulldogs and was named the Player of the Year by The Daytona Beach News-Journal. He opted to transfer to the Providence School in Jacksonville, Florida before his senior year in order to be closer to his father.

College career

Georgia Southern
Burnell started his collegiate career at Georgia Southern University and averaged 2.9 points per game in 24 appearances for the Eagles as a freshman before deciding to leave the program at the end of the season due to lack of playing time.

St. Petersburg
After leaving Georgia Southern, Burnell enrolled at St. Petersburg College. He led the Titans with 20.1 points, 10.9 rebounds, and 1.4 blocks per game and was named the FCSAA State Tournament MVP, First Team All-State, State of Florida Player of the Year and Suncoast Conference Player of the Year.

Jacksonville State
Burnell played for Jacksonville State for his final two years of collegiate eligibility. In his first season with the team, Burnell averaged 11.2 points per game in 35 games (18 starts) overall, and 12.3 points per game with 116 rebounds and 15 blocks during conference play and was named to the Ohio Valley Conference (OVC) All-Newcomer Team. As a senior, Burrell was named first team All-OVC after averaging 17.2 points per game, 9.6 rebounds and 3.2 assists per game.

Professional career

Pallacanestro Cantù
Burnell signed with Pallacanestro Cantù of the Italian Lega Basket Serie A on July 17, 2019. In his first professional season, Burnell averaged 11.7 points, 5.2 rebounds, 1.5 assists and 1.1 steals in 20 Serie A games.

Dinamo Sassari
Burnell signed with Dinamo Sassari on June 6, 2020. He averaged 11.3 points and 6.8 rebounds per game. On July 8, 2021, Burnell re-signed with the team.

New Basket Brindisi
On July 20, 2022, he has signed with New Basket Brindisi of the Lega Basket Serie A.

References

External links
Georgia Southern Eagles bio
Jacksonville State Gamecocks bio
RealGM Profile
EuroBasket profile

1997 births
Living people
American expatriate basketball people in Italy
American men's basketball players
Basketball players from Florida
Dinamo Sassari players
Georgia Southern Eagles men's basketball players
Jacksonville State Gamecocks men's basketball players
Junior college men's basketball players in the United States
Lega Basket Serie A players
New Basket Brindisi players
Pallacanestro Cantù players
People from DeLand, Florida
Small forwards
Sportspeople from Volusia County, Florida
St. Petersburg College alumni